Ackers is a surname. People with this surname include:

Andy Ackers (born 1993), British rugby player
 Benjamin St John Ackers (1839–1915), British Member of Parliament (MP) for West Gloucestershire, 1885
 Gary Ackers (1939–2011), American professor of biochemistry
 Harriet Ackers, later known as Jean Acker, film actress and estranged wife of Rudolf Valentino 
 Heinz Ackers, West German canoer
 James Ackers (1811–1868), British Member of Parliament (MP) for Ludlow, 1841–1847

See also
Ackers Crossing, village in parish of Moreton cum Alcumlow, Cheshire, England
Acker, similar name
Aker (disambiguation)
Akers (disambiguation)